William J. Bichler (November 14, 1870 - December 6, 1926) was a member of the Wisconsin State Assembly and the Wisconsin State Senate.

Biography
Bichler was born on November 14, 1870 in Holland, Sheboygan County, Wisconsin. In 1894, he moved to Belgium, Wisconsin.

His son, Nicholas J. Bichler, would also become a member of the Assembly.

William J. Bichler died in Manitowoc on December 6, 1926.

Career
Bichler was elected to the Assembly in 1906 and was re-elected in 1908. He was a member of the Senate from 1913 to 1915. Previously, he was Chairman of Belgium and Chairman of the Ozaukee County Board. Bichler was also a delegate to the 1912 Democratic National Convention.

References

External links
The Political Graveyard

People from Sheboygan County, Wisconsin
People from Belgium, Wisconsin
County supervisors in Wisconsin
Democratic Party Wisconsin state senators
1870 births
1926 deaths
Democratic Party members of the Wisconsin State Assembly